Parapercis natator is a fish species in the sandperch family, Pinguipedidae. It is found in Japan.

References

Pinguipedidae
Taxa named by John Ernest Randall
Taxa named by Hiroshi Senou
Taxa named by Tetsuo Yoshino
Fish described in 2008